-an is a suffix, commonly used in various Indo-European languages. In English, the -an suffix denotes an action or an adjective suggesting about, thereby forming an agent noun. As such, many demonyms end in this suffix. The root of such agent nouns sometimes comes from the Latin suffix -ia, with the -ia suffix denoting a feminine ending for adjectives.

The suffix -an is also a Persian suffix ( or ), of the Middle Persian and New Persian language. It is a suffix for location, plural formation, formation of infinitives, adverb, and personal pronouns. Birgit Anette Olsen points out that "[O]ne of the functions of the Iranian suffix -an is the derivation of nomina loci."

The suffix is also widely used on many countries in the world, and commonly -stan. The countries following ending with this suffix are Afghanistan, Azerbaijan, Bhutan, Iran, Japan, Jordan, Kazakhstan, Kyrgyzstan, Oman, Pakistan, South Sudan, Sudan, Tajikistan, Turkmenistan, and Uzbekistan.

See also
 -abad
 -stan

References

Persian words and phrases
Place name element etymologies
an